Yankee Doodle Cricket is a 1975 American television animated special directed by American animator Chuck Jones. June Foray was the voice of Queen Bee. It originally aired on ABC on January 16, 1975. The special was released on VHS, and Laserdisc by Family Home Entertainment, and it was released on VHS again in 1999 and on DVD in 2002 and 2007 by Lionsgate Home Entertainment.

Plot
The War of Independence has begun, and Tucker the Mouse, Harry the Cat and Chester C. Cricket are indispensable to the American colonies' effort to free themselves from the rule of the despotic English king. Harry and Tucker help Thomas Jefferson write the Declaration of Independence. Chester creates the tune for "Yankee Doodle Dandy." And all the animals--including John and Marsha, the lightning bugs--help Paul Revere spread the message that The British are coming.

Cast
 Les Tremayne as Chester C. Cricket / Harry the Cat / John the Lightning Bug
 Mel Blanc as Tucker the Mouse / Rattlesnake / Bald Eagle 
 June Foray as Marsha the Lightning Bug / Queen Bee

References

External links

1975 television specials
1970s American television specials
Animated television specials
Television shows directed by Chuck Jones
American animated television films
American children's animated fantasy films
Animated films about insects 
1970s animated television specials
American Broadcasting Company television specials